Karlsruhe-Stadt (English: Karlsruhe City) is an electoral constituency (German: Wahlkreis) represented in the Bundestag. It elects one member via first-past-the-post voting. Under the current constituency numbering system, it is designated as constituency 271. It is located in northwestern Baden-Württemberg, comprising the city of Karlsruhe.

Karlsruhe-Stadt was created for the inaugural 1949 federal election. Since 2021, it has been represented by Zoe Mayer of the Alliance 90/The Greens.

Geography
Karlsruhe-Stadt is located in northwestern Baden-Württemberg. As of the 2021 federal election, it is coterminous with the independent city of Karlsruhe.

History
Karlsruhe-Stadt was created in 1949. In the 1965 through 1976 elections, it was named Karlsruhe. In the 1949 election, it was Württemberg-Baden Landesbezirk Baden constituency 1 in the number system. In the 1953 through 1961 elections, it was number 175. In the 1965 through 1976 elections, it was number 178. In the 1980 through 1998 elections, it was number 175. In the 2002 and 2005 elections, it was number 272. Since the 2009 election, it has been number 271.

Originally, the constituency was coterminous with the independent city of Karlsruhe. In the 1998 election, it also included the municipality of Rheinstetten from the Landkreis Karlsruhe district. Since the 2002 election, it has again been coterminous with the city of Karlsruhe.

Members
The constituency was first represented by Hermann Veit of the Social Democratic Party (SPD) from 1949 to 1953. It was won by Friedrich Werber of the Christian Democratic Union (CDU) in 1953, who served until 1961. He was succeeded by fellow CDU member Max Güde from 1961 to 1969. Peter Corterier of the SPD was elected in 1969 and re-elected in 1972. Gerold Benz of the CDU won the constituency in 1976, but former member Corterier regained it in 1980. Rudolf Ruf of the CDU was representative from 1983 to 1990, followed by fellow CDU member Norbert Rieder from 1990 to 1998. Brigitte Wimmer of the SPD was elected in 1998 and re-elected in 2002. Ingo Wellenreuther of the CDU was representative from 2005 to 2021. Zoe Mayer won the constituency for the Greens in 2021.

Election results

2021 election

2017 election

2013 election

2009 election

References

Federal electoral districts in Baden-Württemberg
1949 establishments in West Germany
Constituencies established in 1949
Karlsruhe